Herbie Sykes is a British sports journalist and writer. His first  book, The Eagle of the Canavese, was published in 2008. A biography of the Italian cyclist Franco Balmamion, it's framed through the story of his victory at the 1962 Giro d'Italia. It was revised and reprinted by  Rapha in 2020. 

Sykes' second book, Maglia Rosa, is an illustrated history of the Giro d'Italia. The first work of its kind in the English language, it was first published in March 2011 and was the Podiumcafe.com cycling book of the year for 2011. Coppi, a collection of photography supported by testimony from Fausto Coppi's contemporaries, was published in 2012. It was shortlisted in the illustrated book category at the 2013 British Sports Book of the Year awards. 

Sykes' fourth book, The Race against the Stasi, was published in September 2014. A biographical study of the defected East German cyclist Dieter Wiedemann, it explores the politicisation of Soviet Bloc sport through the mythical Peace Race. It won the Cycling Book of the Year at the Cross British Sports Book Awards and was nominated in the outstanding general sportswriting category. In addition it was among The Observer sports books of the year. 

The Giro 100 was published by Rapha in 2017, and in 2020 Sykes wrote Juve! 100 Years of an Italian Football Dynasty. Published in UK by  Yellow Jersey Press, the book examines Italy's most successful sporting institution through the twentieth century vicissitudes of Turin and the Agnelli family. It was a Financial Times Sports Book of the Year.

Bibliography

References 

English sportswriters
Living people
Year of birth missing (living people)
Cycling journalists
Cycling writers